Aleksandra Ivošev (Serbian Cyrillic: Александра Ивошев, born 17 March 1974) is a Serbian sport shooter. She won a gold medal in 50 metre rifle three positions  and bronze in 10 m Air rifle at the 1996 Summer Olympics in Atlanta.

She was named as Yugoslav Sportswoman of The Year 1996.
In 1996 she became the inaugural winner of the Golden Badge, the award for the best sportsperson of FR Yugoslavia awarded by the daily Sport.

References

1974 births
Living people
Sportspeople from Novi Sad
Serbian female sport shooters
Yugoslav female sport shooters
Olympic shooters of Yugoslavia
Olympic shooters as Independent Olympic Participants
Olympic gold medalists for Federal Republic of Yugoslavia
Shooters at the 1992 Summer Olympics
Shooters at the 1996 Summer Olympics
Shooters at the 2000 Summer Olympics
Medalists at the 1996 Summer Olympics
Olympic bronze medalists for Federal Republic of Yugoslavia
Olympic medalists in shooting